is a manga and a seven cell manga by Lun Lun Yamamoto. They were first published from 2004 to 2006 in the magazines Asahi Shōgakusei Shimbun and Asahi Chūgakusei Weekly (Asahi Shimbun group), and subsequently adapted into anime series. The anime series, consisting of a total 52 episodes, was broadcast every Sunday from April 4, 2004 until March 27, 2005 on the TV Tokyo and TV Osaka in Japan.

The series focuses on 7 children and a sheep-like character who hang out together and work as a team. Each character is depicted with a varying hairstyle and flavor of fashion.

In creating the anime version, Korean Company (KOKO Enterprise, Seoul Movie) and has co-produced with SBS under the name of work in South Korea called "라즈베리 타임즈 (The Raspberry Times)", this version only aired for 25 episodes.

Plot
Sandy, a girl who lives in Marshmallow Town, whose pet is a sheep-like creature named Cloud, and 6 other children—Jasmine, Lime, Basil, Clove, Nuts and Cinnamon—become friends and form a journalism team and adventure their world together.

Characters

Main Characters

A girl with orange braided hair. She is sometimes seen with her talking pet sheep, Cloud. She is a tomboy, and at night when she sleeps or is in her pajamas her hair is straight. Her mother, father and her twin brothers are seen in several episodes. She can be smart but a little bit.

A pink-haired girl with flowers in her hair and the most popular girl in town. She is very tough and loves to dance. She is very wealthy and is Sandy's best friend. She can also take on any chance what she says.

A green-haired boy. He always hangs out and talks with girls to show love. He can be talented to look at. He can be usually seen with Jasmine in most episodes. He thinks that he can fall in love easily.

A yellow-haired girl who is usually seen with a camera. She wears glasses and may be very brainy, but a good photographer. She loves the color orange and can be very serious. As another best friend of Sandy, she can take pictures with her camera when she sees something. Her attitude is photo life.

A blue-haired boy who always wears headphones. He loves computers and has a stereo in his room. He mostly wears striped clothes.

A black-haired boy who has hair covering his eyes. He usually wears a bandanna on his head. He owns a vegetable garden and is a gardener.

A light-blue-haired girl. She loves fortune telling. She also has a fortune telling outfit. She loves wicked things and makes creepy stuff happen in her room.

Minor Characters
Sandy's Family
The people that live with Sandy. Her mother is an adult woman, her father is very short and her two twin brothers, Choco and Mint love to tease her. Also, Cloud is her friend.

Production Staff
 Story: Lun Lun Yamamoto
 Publisher:  Asahi Gakusei Shimbun
 Director: Hiroshi Fukotomi, Seung Il Lee
 Series Configuration: Nakaze Rika
 Character Designers: Hiroshi Kanazawa, Ji Woon Ha
 Art Director: Rei Nishiyama, Sun Keun Han
 Color-coordinated: Ookura Kimiko, Eui Jeong Namgung
 Director of Photography: Young Ho Kim
 Sound Director:Miwa Iwanami
 Music:Miwa Satoshi
 Producer: Eiji Kanaoka, Kazuya Watanabe, Kati Hideyuki, Jeong Hun Song
 Animation: Studio Comet, Seoul Movie
 Producer: TV Osaka, The Marshmallow Times Production Committee

Episodes
 Cloud came!
 First errand!
 Fear! Doppelganger! !
 Furawamubumento nuts?
 Scoop of basil?
 Jasmine Secret
 Cinnamon is addicted to fortune-telling?
 Symbol of the city, my snail
 Hatsukoi lime
 Clove is a music producer
 Dad, the crisis of restructuring?
 Sandy will be cursed! ?
 Sunny's Dosha降Ri
 Where's Miss marshmallows!
 Angelica Devil
 Battle of the test
 War donuts (Wars)!
 GO! GO! Camping!
 Love lime PARTII
 Midsummer Dream Tour
 Secret Rabbit Dog
 Cloud, run away from home
 Family space mystery
 Cinnamon is a witch! ?
 Ghost of the College
 Take care, communications marshmallows! ?
 The Marshmallow Times (Times) Put on a!
 Cloud Drawing
 Takeshi Mad Mad Mad Race
 Marshmallow Halloween Town!
 She's Sandy! ?
 Pansy came
 Basil Crush
 Oru's house-cloud
 Pansy and year!
 Case out of the department store!
 Christmas in Wonderland
 Back to the proposal
 Advent dark cloud!
 Angelica first love?
 Principal is full! ?
 Longest day of the lime
 Town Holiday Marshmallows
 Cloud and snow fairy
 Battalion Nearby billionaire
 Come to the forest
 Weird! Sandy! !
 My Jasmine
 Basil modestly
 Battle of the sympathy!
 Night cloud
 鳴Rasou the bell of happiness

Songs
Opening Theme:

 "Spicy Days - スパイシーデイズ -, Spicy Days - (supaishideizu)" by Mai Nanami (episodes 1 - 40)
 "Spicy Days - スパイシーデイズ -, Spicy Days - (supaishideizu)" by NAO with Sandy & Cloud (episodes 41 -52)

Ending Theme:

 "歩いてこう, Walking, Like This" by Grace

External links 
 The Marshmallow Times Official Site at TV Osaka 
 The Marshmallow Times information at AllCinema.net 

2004 anime television series debuts
Comedy anime and manga
School life in anime and manga